Belgium competed at the 1934 European Athletics Championships in Turin, Italy, between 7 and 9 September 1934.

Results

Men

Track & road events

Combined events – Decathlon

References
European Athletics Official results

European Athletics Championships
1934
Nations at the 1934 European Athletics Championships